The Castaway Cowboy is a 1974 American comedy western film released by Walt Disney Productions starring James Garner, Vera Miles, Eric Shea, and Robert Culp about a Texas rancher who gets shanghaied, then jumps ship and finds himself washed ashore in Hawaii. Filmed on location in Hawaii, the film was directed by Vincent McEveety and written by Don Tait and Richard M. Bluel.

Garner later wrote "the best thing in it is the Hawaiian scenery."

Plot
Texas cowboy, Lincoln Costain (James Garner), gets "shanghaied" in San Francisco, then jumps ship and washes ashore on the Hawaiian island of Kauai, right into the arms of widow Henrietta MacAvoy (Vera Miles) and her son (Eric Shea) who are struggling to make a living as farmers.  A lot of wild cattle often trample their crops, so Costain gets the idea to start cattle ranching instead. The Hawaiian farm hands don't readily take to the American cowboy culture, and Calvin Bryson (Robert Culp), is a banker with eyes to grab Henrietta's land and maybe Henrietta herself.

Cast
 James Garner as Lincoln Costain
 Vera Miles as Henrietta MacAvoy
 Eric Shea as Booton 'Little Maca' MacAvoy
 Robert Culp as Calvin Bryson
 Elizabeth Smith as Liliha (MacAvoy housekeeper)
 Manu Tupou as Kimo
 Gregory Sierra as Marruja (Bryson's henchman)
 Shug Fisher as Capt. Cary
 Nephi Hannemann as Malakoma (Kahuna)
 Lito Capiña as Leleo
 Ralph Hanalei as Hopu
 Kim Kahana as Oka (as Kahana)
 Lee Woodd as Palani
 Luis Delgado as The Hatman (loses hat to Costain)
 Buddy Joe Hooker as Boatman taking Costain to ship
 Patrick Sullivan Burke as Sea captain in poker game
 Jerry Velasco as Hawaiian cowboy (voice)

See also

 List of American films of 1974

References

External links
 
 
 
 James Garner Interview on the Charlie Rose Show
 James Garner interview at Archive of American Television

1974 films
1970s Western (genre) comedy films
American Western (genre) films
1970s English-language films
Walt Disney Pictures films
Films directed by Vincent McEveety
Films produced by Ron W. Miller
Films produced by Winston Hibler
Films set in Hawaii
Films shot in Hawaii
Films set in 1850
1974 comedy films